Lipiniella is a genus of European non-biting midges in the subfamily Chironominae of the bloodworm family Chironomidae.

Species
L. araenicola Shilova, 1961
L. moderata Kalugina, 1970
L. prima Shilova, Kerkis & Kiknadze, 1993

References

Chironomidae
Diptera of Europe